Two Dancers is the second studio album by British indie rock band Wild Beasts. It was released on 3 August 2009 in the UK on Domino Records, with a US release on 8 September. The track "Hooting and Howling" was released as the album's first single on 20 July. 
Two Dancers was very well received by critics.

In 2010. It was awarded a silver certification from the Independent Music Companies Association which indicated sales of at least 30,000 copies throughout Europe. As of February 2018 it has sold 54,474 copies in United Kingdom and it remains there their top selling album according to OCC.

Reception 

Aggregating website Metacritic reports a "universal acclaim" rating of 83% from notable critics. Pitchfork Media said, "Wild Beasts certainly aren't the first rock band to stand up society's dregs and outcasts, but few others immortalize them on such a wondrous, mythic scale." Drowned in Sound stated, "Two Dancers, then, doesn't so much follow up their debut as announce Wild Beasts as one of our genuinely special bands, one that can compete—in terms of both musical and lyrical ingenuity as well as sheer pop nous—with any US act you've seen talked up in the music press this year."

In 2010, Two Dancers was nominated for the Mercury Prize, which was subsequently won by the xx.

The album was also included in the 2011 revision of the book 1001 Albums You Must Hear Before You Die.

Accolades

Track listing 
 "The Fun Powder Plot" – 5:35
 "Hooting & Howling" – 4:35
 "All the King's Men" – 3:59
 "When I'm Sleepy" – 2:09
 "We Still Got the Taste Dancin' on Our Tongues" – 4:35
 "Two Dancers (i)" – 4:06
 "Two Dancers (ii)" – 2:37
 "This Is Our Lot" – 4:32
 "Underbelly" – 1:54
 "Empty Nest" – 3:24
 "Through the Iron Gate" (iTunes bonus track) – 5:37

Personnel 
 Hayden Thorpe – lead vocals (tracks 1, 2, 4, 5, 8, 9, 11), backing vocals, guitar, bass guitar, keyboards, production
 Tom Fleming – lead vocals (tracks 3, 6, 7, 10), backing vocals, bass guitar, keyboards, guitar, production
 Ben Little – lead guitar, production
 Chris Talbot – drums, backing vocals, production
 Richard Formby – production, engineering
 David Pye – engineering
 Lexxx – mixing
 Russell Fawcus – assistance

Charts

References

2009 albums
Albums produced by Richard Formby
Domino Recording Company albums
Wild Beasts albums